The Tapanahony River (sometimes called Tapanahoni) is a major river in the south eastern part of Suriname, South America. The river originates in the Southern part of the Eilerts de Haan Mountains, near the border with Brazil. It joins the Marowijne River at a place called Stoelmanseiland. Upstream, there are many villages inhabited by Indian Tiriyó people, while further downstream villages are inhabited by the Amerindian Wayana and Maroon Ndyuka people.

Villages along the river

Inhabited by Tiriyó
Aloepi 1 & 2
Palumeu
Pelelu Tepu

Inhabited by Ndyuka
Diitabiki
Godo Holo
Moitaki
Poeketi

Inhabited by Wayana
Apetina

References

Bibliography 
 

Rivers of Suriname